Year of the Villain is a crossover comic book event published by DC Comics. Since May 2019, the event narrates the aftermath of Dark Nights: Metal and the prelude to Batman/Superman vs. The Secret Six and Dark Nights: Death Metal. The crossover and one-shots received generally positive reviews for the characterization of certain villains.

Prelude
After the Source Wall was shattered, four entities known as the Omega Titans began invading Colu, forcing Brainiac to summon the Justice League for help. But as Amanda Waller and the new Task Force XI destroyed him, his great-great-grandson Brainiac 5 informs the League that Brainiac was using them to make sure the Omega Titans would destroy Earth, so there can be no interference for him.

Over time, Lex Luthor found a mysterious object related to an unknown force known as the Totality, while forging a new Legion of Doom, which includes a revived Brainiac and The Batman Who Laughs. The Totality is presumed to be linked to Perpetua, an ancient goddess who was made to vanish by her three children, the Monitor, the Anti-Monitor and the World Forger.

After faking his death through a bombing and with Perpetua's help, Luthor manages to transform himself into a human/Martian hybrid version of himself called "Apex Lex".

Main plot

"The Offer" 
Apex Lex recruits several supervillains to join Perpetua's cause, in exchange of giving them a source of unlimited power. In response, the Justice League recruits heroes around the universe to fight against the new Legion of Doom.

"Dark Gifts" 
The villains debut their newly acquired powers from Lex's offer, leading to the Justice/Doom War.

"Evil Unleashed" 
The heroes deal with the consequences caused by the new powers that the villains gained from Perpetua.

"Doom Rising" 
Perpetua began forming a symbol when heroes and villains began their clashes as she announced the rise of Doom.

"Hostile Takeover" 
The villains have unleashed their true power onto the world.

"Hell Arisen" 
Apex Lex has freed Perpetua, but they both must overcome The Batman Who Laughs first.

Titles involved

Critical reception 
The one-shots of this crossover received generally positive reviews. According to Comic Book Roundup, the one-shots received an average score of 7.8 out of 10.

Future
Between July 2018 and March 2019, Scott Snyder announced Year of the Villain will be followed by Dark Nights: Death Metal, a crossover event for 2020, which will be the sequel to Dark Nights: Metal. Snyder stated: "Everything is coming back, we want to pay it forward. The Omega Titans, Barbatos, the Forge, it’s all coming back. Everything you read, our goal is to reward. All of it culminates in like a year in like a Metal event."

Collected editions

References

DC Comics titles